The Historical Railway of Puerto Rico — or Ferrocarril Histórico de Puerto Rico in Spanish — was a historic  narrow gauge heritage railroad operating within Puerto Rico, an Insular area of the United States. It was located in Fajardo between 1971 to 1975.

History
Jorge Wirshing (grandson of sugar-cane growers, with a bachelor and master in Business Management and work experience for Serrallés Distillery in Ponce) first bought in 1937 the Glover-2-6-2T locomotive from Mercedita Sugar Mill at Ponce for US $581.25 and later the Baldwin 2-8-0 locomotive in 1967 from C. Brewer of Puerto Rico (after withdrawn from service in sugar-cane hauling railway between Pasto Viejo Sugar Mill (Humacao), Juncos Sugar Mill and Santa Juanita Sugar Mill (Caguas), where it was finally stored) for purpose of developing an heritage railroad to attract tourists on steam engine railroading in a time when steam-powered locomotives in Puerto Rico's sugar-mill railways were replaced by diesel-powered ones.

Meanwhile in 1970, Mr. Wirshing got a loan from Fomento (Puerto Rico Economic Development Administration) and permits from Land Authority of Puerto Rico for using the Paraiso branch (southwest of Fajardo Sugar Mill) of the former Fajardo Development Company Railroad now owned by the Puerto Rican Government attached to Central Fajardo operations. 

In April 1971 started the construction of the spur for storage of Glover and Baldwin locomotives, water and fuel tanks and the station building for Ferrocarril Histórico office, ticket window, washrooms, souvenir shop and cafeteria. After months of trial runs and refitting five Gregg cane cars  to passenger wagons, the tourist train started passenger rides in September 4, 1971. Because the sugar harvest, from January to June the Ferrocarril Histórico operated Sundays only; the rest of year it operated on Friday, Saturday, Sunday and certain holidays. The adult fare was US $1.75 and the ride took about one hour. The scheduled ride hours are: 11:00am - 12:30pm - 2:10pm - 3:40pm - 5:00pm.

Engine Roster
In 1972, the locomotive inventory in the Ferrocarril Histórico consisted of eight steam engines:
 Baldwin 2-8-0 Locomotive, ex-Central Pasto Viejo engine No. 8 (9-1927) (36-tons) (Central Juncos No. 8, Eastern Sugar Associates No. 8, Fajardo Eastern Sugar Associates No. 8)(ex-C. Brewer of PR E462), called "Luisa".
 Glover 2-6-2T Locomotive, ex-Central Mercedita C No. 4 (1925) (27-ton), called "Marietta".
 Baldwin 2-8-0 Locomotive, ex-Ponce and Guayama Railroad engine No. 7 (12-1917)
 Baldwin 2-8-0 Locomotive, ex-Ponce and Guayama Railroad engine No. 8 (10-1920) (ex-Central Los Caños No. 1, "Bayaney")
 Baldwin 2-8-0 Locomotive, ex-Ponce and Guayama Railroad engine No. 13 (1-1924) (34-tons)
 Porter 0-6-0T Locomotive, ex-Melchior, Armstrong & Dessau (11-1912) (ex-Central Canovanas No. 7) (ex-Fajardo Eastern Sugar Associates No. 7) (ex-C. Brewer of PR E451) 
 Porter 2-8-2 Locomotive, ex-Central Pasto Viejo engine No. 9 (8-1927) (45-tons) (ex-Central Juncos No. 9) (ex-Eastern Sugar Associates No. 9) (ex-Fajardo Eastern Sugar Associates No. 9) (ex-C. Brewer of PR E463) 
 Alco-Schenectady 2-8-0 Locomotive, ex-L.W.& P. Armstrong (12-1935) (52-tons) (ex-Fajardo Development engine No. 9) (ex-Fajardo Eastern Sugar Associates No. 19) (ex-C. Brewer of PR E451)

Closure and fate of steam engines
As result of flood damages on October 25, 1974, the Ferrocarril Histórico facilities were damaged, forcing its permanent closure for a lack of financial help from insurance, the government, and banks. To liquidate debts from operations, the two Glover 2-6-2T Locomotive and Baldwin 2-8-0 Locomotive steam engines were sold and sent on April 9, 1976 to the Museo del Transporte (Transport Museum) in Caracas, Venezuela, where are in exhibition with the historical locomotives stock of the museum.

References

Sources
 

 Number 43, Second Quarter, 1972. Retrieved 18 February 2021.

 (Photos of the Ferrocarril Histórico station and railway equipment before and after damage by floods. Note: In original publication, is cited: "Damage by Tropical Storm Eloisa (1975)" but this storm came one year later than actual rivers floods that damaged the Ferrocarril Histórico park and machinery in October 1974.)

 (Personal narration of Roger Aponte about experiencies in the Ferrocarril Histórico.) 

 (Entry about the Baldwin 2-8-0 Locomotive "Luisa" steam engine of the Ferrocarril Histórico posted on January 31, 2014.) (in Spanish) 

 (Entry about the fate of the two Ferrocarril Histórico's former Glover Locomotive and Baldwin Locomotive steam engines now in the Caracas Transport Museum in Venezuela.)  

 (Brochure, full color photos and map of the Ferrocarril Histórico.)

 (Note: The Fajardo Development Company was the sugar company who owned the Fajardo Sugar Mill and the tracks used by the Ferrocarril Histórico.)  

 (Original footage of the Ferrocarril Histórico Park and train in movement.)

1971 establishments in Puerto Rico
1974 disestablishments in Puerto Rico
Railway lines opened in 1971
Railway lines closed in 1974
Puerto Rico railroads
Railway lines in Puerto Rico
Passenger rail transport in Puerto Rico
Heritage railroads in Puerto Rico
Tourist attractions in Puerto Rico
Narrow gauge railroads in Puerto Rico
Metre gauge railways
Sugar mill railways